Trent is an unincorporated community and census-designated place (CDP) in Lane County, Oregon, United States. It was first listed as a CDP prior to the 2020 census.

The CDP is in central Lane County, along Rattlesnake Creek, a north-flowing tributary of the Middle Fork Willamette River. The Middle Fork forms the northeast boundary of the CDP. Oregon Route 58 runs through the southern part of Trent, leading northwest  to Eugene, the county seat. To the southeast, Route 58 immediately passes through Dexter and leads  to Oakridge.

Demographics

References 

Census-designated places in Lane County, Oregon
Census-designated places in Oregon